Geghavank is an abandoned village in the Kajaran Municipality of Syunik Province, Armenia. Geghavank is listed as unpopulated in the 2011 Armenian census.

References 

Former populated places in Syunik Province